Acacia repens is a shrub belonging to the genus Acacia and the subgenus Lycopodiifoliae. It is native to a small area in the Kimberley region of Western Australia.

The sprawling, scrambling shrub blooms in June and produces yellow flowers.

See also
List of Acacia species

References

repens
Acacias of Western Australia
Taxa named by Alex George